The Diocese of Ogoja is a Latin Church ecclesiastical territory or diocese of the Catholic Church in Nigeria. It is a suffragan diocese in the ecclesiastical province of the metropolitan Archdiocese of Calabar, yet still depends on the missionary Roman Congregation for the Evangelization of Peoples.

Its cathedra is Saint Benedict Cathedral, dedicated to diocesan patron saint Saint Benedict, in the episcopal see of Ogoja, in Cross River State.

History 
 Established on March 13, 1938 as Apostolic Prefecture of Ogoja, on territory split off from the then Apostolic Prefecture of Calabar (now its Metropolitan)
 1955.01.01: Promoted as Diocese of Ogoja/ Ogogiaën(sis) (Latin)
 On 1973.03.01 it lost territory to establish the Diocese of Abakaliki.

Statistics 
As per 2014, it pastorally served 902,975 Catholics (32.5% of 2,779,037 total) on 12,557 km² in 65 parishes with 99 priests (96 diocesan, 3 religious), 50 lay religious (3 brothers, 47 sisters) and 137 seminarians.

Ordinaries 

Apostolic Prefects of Ogoja 
 Patrick Joseph Whitney, Saint Patrick’s Society for the Foreign Missions (S.P.S.) (born Ireland) (1938 – retired 1939), died 1942; previously Founder of Saint Patrick’s Society for the Foreign Missions (1932.03.17)
 Thomas McGettrick, S.P.S. (born Ireland) (1939.11.10 – 1955.01.01 see below)

Suffragan Bishops of Ogoja 
 Thomas McGettrick, S.P.S. (see above 1955.01.01 – 1973.03.01), later Bishop of Abakaliki (Nigeria) (1973.03.01 – death 1983.02.19)
 Joseph Edra Ukpo (first native incumbent) (1973.03.01 – 2003.12.17), succeeding as former auxiliary bishop of Ogoja and Titular Bishop of Chullu (1971.04.24 – 1973.03.01); later Metropolitan Archbishop of Calabar (Nigeria) (2003.12.17 – retired 2013.02.02)
 John Ebebe Ayah (2006.10.14 – 2014.07.05), stayed on a while as Apostolic Administrator of Ogoja (2014.07.05 – 2017.04.09) while Bishop of Uyo (Nigeria) (2014.07.05 – ...)
 Donatus Edet Akpan (2017.04.09 – ...), no previous prelature.

See also 
 List of Catholic dioceses in Nigeria
 Roman Catholicism in Nigeria

References

Sources and external links
 GCatholic.org, with Google satellite photo - data for all sections
 Catholic Hierarchy

Roman Catholic Ecclesiastical Province of Calabar
Roman Catholic dioceses in Nigeria
Religious organizations established in 1938
Roman Catholic dioceses and prelatures established in the 20th century
1938 establishments in Nigeria